Józef Piotr Kupny (born 23 February 1956) is a Polish Catholic priest, current archbishop of Wrocław, and was the auxiliary bishop of the Roman Catholic Archdiocese of Katowice from 2006 to 2013.

Józef Kupny is also a sociologist, having lectured in several universities in Poland (primarily in Silesia), and author of various sociologist publications. He is primarily interested in sociology of religion and ethics.

References
Bishop Józef Piotr Kupny on catholic-hierarchy.org
 Życiorys biskupa nominata ks. dra Józefa Kupnego, 21.12.2005

1956 births
Archbishops of Wrocław
Cardinal Stefan Wyszyński University in Warsaw alumni
Polish sociologists
Living people